Get the Grift is a 2021 Brazilian comedy film directed by Pedro Antônio Paes, written by Fil Braz and starring Zeca Carvalho, Thelmo Fernandes and Caito Mainier.

Plot 
Ever since his childhood, Clovis had to change from families to families due to his biological father as well as stepmother and stepfather keep remarrying. As an adult, Clovis is a con artist while moonlighting as an art forger who paints famous paintings to sell to a corrupt senator who in turns selling them in the black market with ten times the price. Clovis's expert conning technique enable him to get free goods and services but he is abided by his principle of only conning the rich and he willing to pay to buy goods and services from the poor.

Cast 
 Zeca Carvalho
 Thelmo Fernandes
 Caito Mainier
 Marcus Majella
 Pedroca Monteiro
 Pablo Sanábio
 Samantha Schmütz

Release
The film was digitally released on April 28, 2021 by Netflix.

References

External links 
 
 

2021 films
2021 comedy films
Brazilian comedy films
2020s Portuguese-language films
Portuguese-language Netflix original films